Edward Lewis (born 21 June 1926) was an English professional footballer who played in the Football League for Leyton Orient as a goalkeeper.

Career statistics

References 

1926 births
English Football League players
Clapton Orient F.C. wartime guest players
English footballers
Association football goalkeepers
Sportspeople from West Bromwich
Leyton Orient F.C. players
Possibly living people